"Nobody Rides for Free" is a single by the American heavy metal band Ratt. It was originally taken from the Point Break soundtrack.

The song was written several years before its release by songwriter, Steve Caton, who performed it live many times in various Los Angeles and Hollywood clubs with his band Climate of Crisis. Later, after the song was presented to Ratt for the Point Break soundtrack, members Stephen Pearcy, Warren DeMartini, and Juan Croucier made their own changes to it, primarily in lyrics. This was Ratt's first single recorded without guitarist Robbin Crosby who left the band the year before due to a drug addiction. The song was played during the ending credits of Point Break.

Music video 

The music video for the song shows the band playing on a beach, intercut with some clips from the 1991 action-thriller Point Break.

Personnel 

 Stephen Pearcy – lead vocals
 Warren DeMartini – guitar
 Juan Croucier – bass, backing vocals
 Bobby Blotzer – drums

External links 
 Lyrics

1991 singles
Ratt songs